Nemanja Knezevic (born 20 October 1987) is a Montenegrin professional basketball player. Outside of his home country, he has played in Bosnia, France, Iceland, Serbia and Spain. In Iceland, he led the top-tier Úrvalsdeild karla in rebounding during the 2021-2022 season.

Professional career
In 2017, Knezevic joined Vestri in the 1. deild karla. He led the league in rebounds in both 2018 and 2019, while also being in top ten in scoring. In 2019–2020, Knezevic averaged 18.4 points and 13.8 rebounds per game. During the 2020–2021 season, Knezevic averaged 16.5 points and 15.9 rebounds and helped Vestri win the 1. deild promotion playoffs. In his first Úrvalsdeild game, Knezevic postes season highs of 22 points and 3 blocks along with 16 rebounds in a double overtime loss against Keflavík. On 17 February 2022, he posted a triple-double against Tindastóll with 12 points, 19 rebounds and 11 assists. Appearing in all 22 games, he averaged 12.2 points and led the league with 12.1 rebounds per game. Following the season, he stayed in the Úrvalsdeild and signed with newly promoted Höttur.

References

External links
Icelandic statistics at Icelandic Basketball Association
Profile at Eurobasket.com

1987 births
Living people
Centers (basketball)
Nemanja Knezevic
Montenegrin men's basketball players
Montenegrin expatriate basketball people in France
Montenegrin expatriate basketball people in Serbia
Montenegrin expatriate basketball people in Spain
Nemanja Knezevic
Nemanja Knezevic